The next Icelandic parliamentary election will be held on or before the Saturday 27 September 2025 to elect 63 members of parliament to the Althing.

Background

Previous election
The 2021 parliamentary election took place on 25 September, a month before the latest date allowed by law. The government coalition of the Left-Green Movement, the Progressive Party and the Independence Party, led by prime minister Katrín Jakobsdóttir, had been in place since the 2017 elections. This unusual coalition of parties from the left wing, the center and the right wing of Icelandic mainstream politics maintained its majority in parliament in the elections as the Independence Party had the same number of seats as before while the Progressive Party added 5 seats and the Left-Green movement lost 3. As for the opposition parties, the People's Party gained two seats and the Reform Party gained 1 seat. The Pirate Party held steady but the Social Democratic Alliance lost 1 seat and the Centre Party lost 4 of its seats in parliament. The Icelandic Socialist Party received 4.1% of the vote but no seats as 5% of the national vote is needed to eligible for the allocation of leveling seats. 

The coalition partners from the previous term soon decided that the first option for coalition talks should be to renew their coalition. The second cabinet of Katrín Jakobsdóttir was then formed on 28 November.

Electoral system 
The 63 members of the Althing are elected by open list proportional representation in six multi-member constituencies, with 54 seats distributed between parties at the constituency level with no electoral threshold and 9 leveling seats assigned to party lists at the national level with a threshold of 5 percent required in order to ensure proportionality with the election result. The 54 constituency seats are distributed within each constituency according to the D'Hondt method. Election lists are determined by parties; although voters have the option of altering the order of candidates or striking out particular candidates entirely but these rarely have any effect on the result.

The number of voters per parliamentary seats varies significantly between the constituencies of Iceland. The number of seats per constituency was determined by law in 1999 and is not updated before each election except when the number of voters per each representative in the most represented constituency reaches half the number of voters per each representative in the least represented constituency. The constitution stipulates that in this case, a constituency seat should be transferred from the most represented constituency to the least represented constituency. This has already happened twice since 1999, in both cases transferring a constituency seat from the Northwest constituency to the Southwest constituency. In the 2021 election, the number of eligible voters behind each seat in the Southwest was 5671.5, more than double the 2693.5 eligible voters behind each seat in the Northwest. According to the constitution this means another transfer of a constituency seat from the Northwest to the Southwest before the next parliamentary election.

Date 
Per Article 23 in Chapter V of Act No. 112 from the 25 June 2021 Elections Law, elections must be held no later than the same weekday of the month four years after the previous elections, counting from the turn of the month; therefore, because the 2021 election took place on the fourth Saturday in September, the latest possible date for the next election is 27 September 2025.

Opinion polls

References

Parliamentary
Parliamentary elections in Iceland
Iceland
Iceland